"Your Touch" is a song by American singer-songwriter and beatboxer Blake Lewis. The song was released in the United States as a digital download on February 26, 2013 as the lead single from his third studio album Portrait of a Chameleon (2013). It peaked at number 38 on the UK Singles Chart. The song premiered on February 26, 2013 in a commercial for Internet Explorer 10.

Track listing

Chart performance

Release history

References

2013 singles
Blake Lewis songs
Republic Records singles
2013 songs